Atilio Tass (born 7 July 1957) is an Argentine fencer. He competed in the individual sabre event at the 1984 Summer Olympics. He was formerly the head coach of the Brown University fencing team.

References

External links
 

1957 births
Living people
Argentine male fencers
Argentine sabre fencers
Olympic fencers of Argentina
Fencers at the 1984 Summer Olympics
Pan American Games medalists in fencing
Pan American Games bronze medalists for Argentina
Fencers at the 1979 Pan American Games